Tar is a village in Nógrád county, Hungary. There are some natural sources near here, for ex. Csevice source

External links 
 Street map 

Populated places in Nógrád County